Orio Litta is a comune (municipality) in the Province of Lodi in the Italian region Lombardy, located about  southeast of Milan and about  southeast of Lodi.

Orio Litta borders the following municipalities: Livraga, San Colombano al Lambro, Ospedaletto Lodigiano, Senna Lodigiana, Chignolo Po, Calendasco, Monticelli Pavese.

1765 wolf attack 

On November 21, 1765 a rabid wolf attacked the residents of Orio Litta, biting sixteen people before being killed. Fourteen of the victims died after being taken to the Lodi hospital.

Demographic evolution

References

External links
 www.comune.oriolitta.lo.it/

Cities and towns in Lombardy